Quynanlu Bamir (also Romanized as Qūynānlū Bāmīr, Qūnīānlū Bāmīr, and Qowynānlū-ye Bāmīr; also known as Qū’īnānlū) is a village in Golian Rural District, in the Central District of Shirvan County, North Khorasan Province, Iran. At the 2006 census, its population was 91, in 18 families.

References 

Populated places in Shirvan County